Thudikkum Karangal is a 1983 Indian Tamil-language action drama film written and directed by C. V. Sridhar, and produced by K. R. Gangadharan. The film stars Rajinikanth and Radha, while Jaishankar, Sujatha, Vijayakumar and Y. G. Mahendran play other supporting roles. The film's soundtrack was composed by S. P. Balasubrahmanyam, who made his debut as composer with this film in Tamil. The film was predominantly shot in Ooty, where filming lasted a month. It was a box-office bomb.

Plot 

Gopi is an auto mechanic and brother of Balu, who works in Ramesh's estate as a clerk. The film portrays the events dealing with the clash between Gopi and Ramesh. Radha is the love interest of Gopi and Babu provides comic relief.

Cast 
Rajinikanth as Gopi
Radha as Radha
 Jaishankar as Ramesh
Sujatha as Balu's wife
Vijayakumar as Balu
 Y. G. Mahendran as Babu
 Vanitha Krishnachandran as Stella
 Prathapachandran as Church father
 Silk Smitha as Seetha
LIC Narasimhan as Doctor
Master Haja Sheriff as Workshop boy

Soundtrack 
The music was composed by S. P. Balasubrahmanyam, while lyrics were written by Pulamaipithan and Gangai Amaran.

References

External links 
 

1980s action drama films
1980s Tamil-language films
1983 films
Films directed by C. V. Sridhar
Films scored by S. P. Balasubrahmanyam
Films shot in Ooty
Indian action drama films